Isla de Ratones may refer to:
 Isla de Ratones (Cabo Rojo, Puerto Rico), an islet in Cabo Rojo, Puerto Rico
 Isla de Ratones (Ponce, Puerto Rico), an islet in Ponce, Puerto Rico